Fredriksson is a Swedish surname. Notable people with the surname include:

*Börje Fredriksson (1937–1968), Swedish jazz tenor saxophonist
Carl Henrik Fredriksson (born 1965), Swedish literary critic, columnist, essayist, and translator living in Vienna, Austria
David Fredriksson (born 1985), Swedish ice hockey player
Erik Algot Fredriksson (1885–1930), Swedish tug of war competitor who competed in the 1912 Summer Olympics
Erik Fredriksson (born 1943), former Swedish football referee
Gert Fredriksson (1919–2006), Swedish sprint canoeist who competed from 1942 to 1964
Håkan Fredriksson (born 1970), Swedish producer and musician
Kristian Fredrikson (1940–2005), New Zealand-born Australian stage and costume designer
Marianne Fredriksson (1927–2007), Swedish author who worked and lived in Roslagen and Stockholm
Marie Fredriksson (1958–2019), Swedish pop singer-songwriter and pianist, member of the pop duo Roxette
Mathias Fredriksson (born 1973), Swedish cross country skier who has competed since 1993
Otto Fredrikson (born 1981), Finnish football goalkeeper
Stig Fredriksson (born 1956), former Swedish football defender
Thobias Fredriksson (born 1975), Swedish cross-country skier who has competed since 2000

See also
Frederiksen
Fredrickson

Patronymic surnames
Swedish-language surnames
Surnames from given names